Thomas O'Luceran (some sources O’Lucheran), a Canon of Armagh since 1397, was appointed Dean of Armagh in 1406, and was deprived in1414.

References

Deans of Armagh
14th-century Irish Roman Catholic priests
15th-century Irish Roman Catholic priests